

A–G 

To find entries for A–G, use the table of contents above.

H 

 Ha – Thi Dung Ha (fl. 1970)
 Haage – Friedrich Adolph Haage (1796–1866)
 H.A.Baker – Hugh Arthur Baker (1896–1976)
 Hablitz – Carl Ludwig von Hablitz (also as Karl Ivanovich Gablits) (1752–1821)
 Hack. – Eduard Hackel (1850–1926)
 Hacq. – Belsazar Hacquet (1739–1815)
 H.A.Crum – Howard Alvin Crum (1922–2002)
 Haeckel – Ernst Haeckel (1834–1919)
 Haegi – Laurence Arnold Robert Haegi (born 1952)
 Haenke – Thaddäus Haenke (1761–1817)
 Haev. – Thomas Haevermans (fl. 2000)
 Hagedorn – Gregor Hagedorn (born 1965) 
 Häkkinen – Markku Häkkinen (1946–2015)
 Halácsy – Eugen von Halácsy (1842–1913)
 Halda – Josef Jakob Halda (born 1943)
 Haller – Albrecht von Haller (1708–1777)
 Haller f. – Albrecht von Haller (son of the above) (1758–1823)
 Hallier – Ernst Hans Hallier (1831–1904)
 Hallier f. – Johannes Gottfried Hallier (1868–1932)
 Ham. – William Hamilton (1783–1856)
 Hambali – Gregori G. Hambali (fl. 2000)
 Hamel – Gontran Georges Henri Hamel (1883–1944)
 Hammel – Barry Edward Hammel (born 1946)
 Hamer – Fritz Hamer (1912–2004)
 Hämet-Ahti – Raija-Leena Hämet-Ahti (born 1931)
 H.A.Mill. – Harvey Alfred Miller (1928–2020)
 Hammen – Thomas van der Hammen (1924–2010)
 Hampe – Georg Ernst Ludwig Hampe (1795–1880)
 Hance – Henry Fletcher Hance (1827–1886)
 Hancock – Thomas Hancock (1783–1849)
 Hand.-Mazz. – Heinrich Raphael Eduard Handel-Mazzetti (1882–1940)
 Hanelt – Peter Hanelt (born 1930)
 Hanes – Clarence Robert Hanes (1876–1956)
 Hanin – Jean-Louis Hanin (fl. 1800)
 Hanks – Lena Tracy Hanks (1879–1944)
 Hannaford – Samuel Hannaford (1828–1874)
 Hanry – Hippolyte Hanry (1807–1893)
 Hanst. – Johannes Ludwig Emil Robert von Hanstein (1822–1880)
 Har. – Paul Auguste Hariot (1854–1917)
 Hara – Kanesuke Hara (1885–1962)
 Harb. – Thomas Grant Harbison (1862–1936)
 Hard – Miron Elisha Hard (1849–1914)
 Hardin – James Walker Hardin (born 1929)
 Harid. – K. Haridasan (fl. 1985)
 Harkn. – Harvey Willson Harkness (sometimes spelled Wilson) (1821–1901)
 Harling – Gunnar Wilhelm Harling (1920–2010)
 Harmaja – Harri Harmaja (born 1944)
 Harms – Hermann Harms (1870–1942)
 Harry Hall – Harry Hall (1906–1986)
 Hart – Henry Chichester Hart (1847–1908)
 Hartig – Theodor Hartig (1805–1880)
 Harting – Pieter Harting (1812–1885)
 Hartinger – Anton Hartinger (1806–1890)
 Hartland – William Baylor Hartland (1836–1912)
 Hartm. – Carl Johan Hartman (1790–1849)
 Hartog –  (born 1931)
 Hartw. – Karl Theodor Hartweg (1812–1871)
 Hartwig – August Karl Julius Hartwig (1823–1913)
 Hartwiss – Nicolai Anders von Hartwiss (1791–1860)
 Harv. – William Henry Harvey (1811–1866)
 Harv.-Gibs. – Robert John Harvey-Gibson (1860–1929)
 Harvill – Alton McCaleb Harvill, Jr (1916–2008)
 Harz – Carl Otto Harz (1842–1906)
 Hass –  (born 1953)
 Hassall – Arthur Hill Hassall (1817–1894)
 Hässel – Gabriela Gustava Hässel de Menéndez (1927–2009)
 Hasselq. – Fredric Hasselquist (1722–1752)
 Hasselt – Johan Coenraad van Hasselt (1797–1823)
 Hassk. – Justus Carl Hasskarl (1811–1894)
 Hassl. – Emil Hassler (1864–1937)
 Hatch – Edwin Daniel Hatch (1919–2008)
 Hatus. – Sumihiko Hatusima (1906–2008)
 Haufler – Christopher H. Haufler (born 1950)
 Haught. – Samuel Haughton (1821–1897)
 Hauke – Richard L. Hauke (1930–2001)
 Hauman – Lucien Leon Hauman (1880–1965)
 Hauser – Margit Luise Hauser
 Hausskn. – Heinrich Carl Haussknecht (1838–1903)
 Hav. – Johan Jonson Havaas (1864–1956)
 Havard – Valéry Havard (1846–1927)
 Havil. – George Darby Haviland (1857–1901)
 Haw. – Adrian Hardy Haworth (1768–1833)
 Hawke – Margaret Louise Hawke (born 1984)
 Hawkes – John Gregory Hawkes (1915–2007)
 Hawkeswood – Trevor J. Hawkeswood (born 1956)
 Hawksw. –  (1926–1993)
 Hayata – Bunzō Hayata (1874–1934)
 Hayek – August von Hayek (1871–1928)
 Haynald – Cardinal Stephan Franz Lajos (Ludwig) Haynald (1816–1891)
 Hayne – Friedrich Gottlob Hayne (1763–1832)
 Haynes – Caroline Coventry Haynes (1858–1951)
 Hazsl. – Friedrich August Hazslinszky von Hazslin (1818–1896)
 H.Baumann – Helmut Baumann (born 1937)
 H.B.Holl — Harvey Buchanan Holl (1820–1886)
 H.Blossf. – Harry Blossfeld (1913–1986)
 H.B.Matthews – Henry Bleneowe Matthews (1861–1934)
 H.B.Naithani –  H.B. Naithani (born 1944)
 H.Bock – Hieronymus Bock (1498–1554)
 H.Bruggen – Heinrich Wilhelm Eduard (Harry) van Bruggen (1927–2010)
 H.Buek. – Heinrich Wilhelm Buek (1796–1878)
 H.B.Wang – Hai Bo Wang (fl. 2008)
 H.B.Ward – Henry Baldwin Ward (1865–1945)
 H.B.Will – Herbert Bennett Williamson (1860–1931)
 H.C.Beardslee – Henry Curtis Beardslee, Sr. (1807–1884) (father of Henry Curtis Beardslee, Jr. (1865–1948, abbrev. Beardslee))
 H.C.Bold – Harold Charles Bold (1909–1987)
 H.C.Cutler – Hugh Carson Cutler (1912–1998) 
 H.C.Hopkins – Helen Collingwood Hopkins (born 1953)
 H.C.Watson – Hewett Watson (1804–1881)
 H.D.Clarke – Hugh David Clarke (born 1962)
 H.Deane – Henry Deane (1847–1924)
 H.De Orléans – Prince Henri of Orléans (1877–1904)
 H.Dietr. – Helga Dietrich (1940–2018)
 H.Durand – Hélène Durand (1883–1934)
 H.D.Wilson – Hugh Wilson (born 1945)
 Heads – Michael J. Heads (born 1957)
 H.E.Ahles – Harry E. Ahles (1924–1981)
 Heatubun – Charlie Danny Heatubun (born 1973)
 H.E.Bigelow – Howard E. Bigelow (1923–1987)
 Heckard – Lawrence Ray Heckard (1923–1991) 
 Heckel – Édouard Marie Heckel (1843–1916)
 Hector – James Hector (1834–1907)
 Hedberg – Karl Olov Hedberg (1923–2007)
 Hedd. – Terry Albert John Hedderson (born 1962)
 Hedge – Ian Charleson Hedge (born 1928)
 Hedl. – Johan Teodor Hedlund (1861–1953)
 Hedrick – Ulysses Prentiss Hedrick (1870–1951)
 Hedw. – Johann (Johannes, Joannis) Hedwig (1730–1799)
 Heenan – Peter Brian Heenan (born 1961) 
 Heer – Oswald von Heer (1809–1883)
 Heering – Wilhelm Christian August Heering (1876–1916)
 Hegde – R.K. Hegde (1931–1991)
 Hegelm. – Christoph Friedrich Hegelmaier (1833–1906)
 Hegetschw. – Johannes Jacob Hegetschweiler (1789–1839)
 H.E.Horne – Howard E. Horne (fl. 2016)
 Heim – Georg Christoph Heim (1743–1807)
 Heimerl – Anton Heimerl (1857–1942)
 Heine – Hermann Heino Heine (1922–1996)
 Heinr. – Emil Johann Lambert Heinricher (1856–1934)
 Heintze – August Heintze (1881–1941)
 Heiser – Charles Bixler Heiser (1920–2010)
 Heist. – Lorenz Heister (1683–1758)
 H.E.K.Hartmann – Heidrun Hartmann (1942–2016)
 Hekking – William Henri Alphonse Maria Hekking (1930–1996)
 Heldr. – Theodor Heinrich Hermann von Heldreich (1822–1902)
 Hell. – Carl Niclas Hellenius (1745–1820)
 Hellq. – Carl Barre Hellquist (born 1940)
 Helms – Richard Helms (1842–1914)
 Helwing – George Andreas (Jerzy Andrzej) Helwing (1666–1748)
 H.E.Moore – Harold Emery Moore (1917–1980)
 Hemprich – Wilhelm Hemprich (1796–1825)
 Hemsl. – William Botting Hemsley (1843–1924)
 Hend. – Edward George Henderson (1782–1876)
 Hendel – Johann Christian Hendel (1742–1823)
 Hendrych – Radovan Hendrych (1926–2004)
 Henfr. – Arthur Henfrey (1819–1859)
 Henn. – Paul Christoph Hennings (1841–1908)
 Hennessy – Esmé Frances Hennessy (born 1933)
 Henrard – Johannes Theodoor Henrard (1881–1974)
 Henrickson – James Solberg Henrickson (born 1940)
 Henriq. – Julio Augusto Henriques (1838–1928)
 Henry H.Johnst. – Henry Halcro Johnston (1856–1939)
 Hensch. – August Wilhelm Eduard Theodor Henschel (1790–1856)
 Hensen – Victor Hensen (1835–1924)
 Hensl. – John Stevens Henslow (1796–1861)
 Henssen – Aino Marjatta Henssen (1925–2011)
 Henwood – Murray J. Henwood (fl. 1998)
 H.E.Petersen – Henning Eiler (Ejler) Petersen (1877–1946)
 Hepper – Frank Nigel Hepper (1929–2013)
 Hepting – George Henry Hepting (1907–1988)
 Herb. – William Herbert (1778–1847)
 Herder – Ferdinand Gottfried Theobald Herder (1828–1896)
 Hereman – Samuel Hereman (fl. 1868)
 Hérincq – François Hérincq (1820–1891)
 Hering – Constantine (Constantijn) J. Hering (1800–1880)
 Herklots – Geoffrey Alton Craig Herklots (1902–1986)
 Herm. – Paul Hermann (1646–1695)
 Hermans – Johan Hermans (born 1956)
 Herre – Albert William Herre (1868–1962)
 Herrm. – Johann Herrmann (1738–1800)
 Hershk. – Mark A. Hershkovitz (born 1946) 
 Herter – Wilhelm(Guillermo) Gustav(o) Franz(Francis) Herter (1884–1958)
 Herv. – Alpheus Baker Hervey (1839–1931)
 Herzog – Theodor Carl Julius Herzog (1880–1961)
 Heslewood – Margaret M. Heslewood (fl. 2013)
 Hesl.-Harr. – John William Heslop-Harrison (1881–1967)
 Hesl.-Harr.f. – Jack Heslop-Harrison (1920–1998)
 Hess – Johann Jakob Hess (1844–1883)
 Hesse – Hermann Albrecht Hesse (1852–1937)
 Hett. – Wilbert Hetterscheid (born 1957)
 Heubl – Günther Heubl (born 1952)
 H.E.White – Harold Everett White (born 1899)
 Heward – Robert Heward (1791–1877)
 Hewson – Helen Joan Hewson (1938–2007)
 Heybroek – Hans M. Heybroek (born 1927)
 Heyn – Chaia Clara Heyn (1924–1998)
 Heynh. – Gustav Heynhold (1800–1860)
 Heywood – Vernon Hilton Heywood (born 1927)
 H.F.Comber – Harold Frederick Comber (1897–1969)
 H.F.Copel. – Herbert Faulkner Copeland (1902–1968)
 H.Fisch. – Hugo Fischer (1865–1939)
 H.F.Loomis – Harold Frederick Loomis (1896–1976)
 H.Friedrich – Heimo Friedrich (fl. 1974)
 H.F.Yan – Hai-Fei Yan (fl. 2012)
 H.G.Baker – Herbert George Baker (1920–2001)
 H.G.Barclay – Harriet George Barclay (1901–1990) 
 H.G.P.Duyfjes – Hendrik Gerard Pieter Duyfjes (1908–1943)
 H.Groves – Henry Groves (1855–1912)
 H.Gross – Hugo Gross (1888–1968)
 H.G.Sm. – Henry George Smith (1852–1924)
 H.Hara – Hiroshi Hara (1911–1986)
 H.H.Bancr. – Helen Holme Bancroft (1887–1950) 
 H.H.Blom – Hans Haavardsholm Blom (born 1955)
 H.H.Eaton – Hezekiah Hulbert Eaton (1809–1832)
 H.H.Hume – Hardrada Harold Hume (1875–1965)
 H.H.Johnst. – Henry "Harry" Hamilton Johnston (1858–1927)
 H.H.Lin – Hong Hui Lin (fl. 2007)
 H.Hoffm. – Heinrich Karl Hermann Hoffmann (1819–1891)
 H.Huber – Herbert Franz Josef Huber (1931–2005)
 H.H.White – Henry Hoply White (1790–1876)
 Hickel – Paul Robert Hickel (1865–1935)
 Hidayat – Arief Hidayat (fl. 2009)
 Hiepko – Paul Hubertus Hiepko (1932–2019)
 Hiern – William Philip Hiern (1839–1925)
 Hieron. – Georg Hans Emmo Wolfgang Hieronymus (1846–1921)
 Hildm. – Heinrich Hildmann (ca. 1845–after 1918)
 Hilg. – Theodore Charles Hilgard (1828–1875)
 Hill – John Hill (1716–1775)
 Hillebr. – William (Wilhelm) Hillebrand (1821–1886)
 Hillh. – William Hillhouse (1850–1910)
 Hilliard – Olive Mary Hilliard (1925–2022)
 Hillier –  (1871–1962)
 Hillmann – Johannes Hillmann (1881–1943)
 H.Iltis – Hugo Iltis (1882–1952)
 Himmelr. – Sven Himmelreich (fl. 2007)
 Hindm. – Mary MacLean Hindmarsh (1921–2000)
 Hinds – Richard Brinsley Hinds (1811–1846)
 Hirmer – Max Hirmer (1893–1981)
 Hirn – Karl Engelbrecht Hirn (1872–1907)
 Hising. – Wilhelm Hisinger (1766–1852)
 Hislop – Michael Clyde Hislop (born 1955)
 Hitchc. – Albert Spear Hitchcock (1865–1935)
 H.Jacobsen – Hermann Johannes Heinrich Jacobsen (1898–1978)
 H.Jaeger – Hermann Jäger (1815–1890)
 H.J.Atkins – Hannah Jane Atkins (born 1971)
 H.J.Br. – Helen Jean Brown (1903–1982)
 H.J.Carter – Herbert James Carter (1858–1940)
 H.J.Chowdhery – Harsh Jeet Chowdhery (born 1949)
 H.J.Lam – Herman Johannes Lam (1892–1977)
 H.J.P.Winkl. – Hubert J.P. Winkler (1875–1941)
 H.J.Su – Horng Jye Su (born 1943)
 H.J.Veitch – Harry James Veitch (1840–1924)
 H.Karst. – Gustav Karl Wilhelm Hermann Karsten (1817–1908)
 H.K.A.Winkl. – Hans Karl Albert Winkler (1877–1945)
 H.Keng – Hsüan Keng (1923–2009)
 H.Kost. – Henry Koster (1793–1820)
 H.Koyama – Hiroshige Koyama (1937–2016)
 H.Kurz – Hermann Kurz (1886–1965)
 H.K.Walter – Heinrich (Karl) Walter (1898–1989)
 Hladnik – Franz Hladnik (1773–1844)
 H.L.Blomq. – Hugo Leander Blomquist (1888–1964)
 H.Lév. – Augustin Abel Hector Léveillé (1863–1918)
 H.Limpr. – Hans Wolfgang Limpricht (born 1877) 
 H.Lindb. – Harald Lindberg (1871–1963)
 H.L.Jacobs – Homer L. Jacobs (1899–1981)
 H.L.Li – Hui-lin Li (1911–2002)
 H.Lorentz – Hendrikus Albertus Lorentz (1871–1944) (not Hendrik Lorentz)
 H.Low – Hugh Low (1824–1905)
 H.L.Sm. – Hamilton Lanphere Smith (1819–1903)
 H.L.Späth – Hellmut Ludwig Späth (1885–1945)
 H.Luther – Harry Edward Luther (1952–2012)
 H.L.Wendl. – Heinrich Ludolph Wendland (1792–1869)
 H.Mann – Horace Mann Jr. (1844–1868)
 H.Mason – Herbert Louis Mason (1896–1994)
 H.M.Curran – Hugh McCollum Curran (1875–1960) (also Hugh McCullum Curran)
 H.M.Hall – Harvey Monroe Hall (1874–1932)
 H.M.Hern. – Héctor Manuel Hernández, aka Héctor Hernández Macías (born 1954)
 H.M.L.Forbes – Helena M.L. Forbes (1900–1959) 
 H.Mohr. – Hartmut Mohr (fl. 1984)
 H.Moseley – Henry Nottidge Moseley (1844–1891)
 H.Müll. – Heinrich Ludwig Hermann Müller (1829–1883)
 H.M.Ward – Harry Marshall Ward (1854–1906)
 H.N.Andrews – Henry Nathaniel Andrews (1910–2002)
 Hnatiuk – Roger James Hnatiuk (born 1946)
 H.N.Barber – Horace Barber (1914–1971)
 H.Nicholson – Henry Alleyne Nicholson (1844–1899)
 Hobdy – R.W. Hobdy (fl. 1984)
 Hobson – Edward Hobson (1782–1830)
 Hoch – Peter C. Hoch (fl. 1992)
 Hochr. – Bénédict Pierre Georges Hochreutiner (1873–1959)
 Hochst. – Christian Ferdinand Friedrich Hochstetter (1787–1860)
 Hodel – Donald Robert Hodel (born 1953)
 Hodgdon – Albion Reed Hodgdon (1909–1976)
 Hoefker – Heinrich Hoefker (1859–1945)
 Høeg – Ove Arbo Høeg (1898–1993)
 Hoehne – Frederico Carlos Hoehne (1882–1959)
 Hoevel – Otto Hövel (fl. 1970)
 Hoeven – Jan van der Hoeven (1801–1868)
 Hoffm. – Georg Franz Hoffmann (1760–1826)
 Hoffmanns. – Johann Centurius von Hoffmannsegg (1766–1849)
 Hoffmeister – Werner Hoffmeister (1819–1845) 
 Hoffstad – Olaf Alfred Hoffstad (1865–1943)
 H.O.Forbes – Henry Ogg Forbes (1851–1932)
 Hogg – Thomas Hogg (1777–1855)
 H.Ohashi – Hiroyoshi Ohashi (born 1936)
 H.Ohba – Hideaki Ohba (born 1943)
 Hohen. – Rudolph Friedrich Hohenacker (1798–1874)
 Höhn. – Franz Xaver Rudolf von Höhnel (1852–1920)
 H.Okada – Hiroshi Okada (born 1963)
 Holland – John Henry Holland (1869–1950)
 Hollick – Charles Arthur Hollick (1857–1933)
 Holloway – John Ernest Holloway (1881–1945)
 Hollrung – Max Udo Hollrung (1858–1937)
 Holmb. – Otto Rudolf Holmberg (1874–1930)
 Holmes – Edward Morell Holmes (1843–1930)
 Holmgren – Hjalmar Josef Holmgren (1822–1885)
 Holm-Niels. – Lauritz Broder Holm-Nielsen (born 1946)
 Holmsk. – Johan Theodor Holmskjold (1731–1793)
 Holttum – Richard Eric Holttum (1895–1990)
 Holub – Josef Ludwig Holub (1930–1999)
 Holz. – John Michael Holzinger (1853–1929)
 Hombr. – Jacques Bernard Hombron (1800–1852)
 Homolle – Anne-Marie Homolle (1912–2006) 
 Honck. – Gerhard August Honckeny (1724–1805)
 Honda –  (1897–1984)
Honegger – Rosmarie Honegger (born 1947)
 Honey – Edwin Earle Honey (1891–1956)
 Hong-Wa – Cynthia Hong-Wa (fl. 2009)
 Hong Yu – Hong Yu (fl. 2003)
 Hoog – Johannes Marius Cornelis Hoog (1865–1950)
 Hoogland – Ruurd Dirk Hoogland (1922–1994)
 Hook. – William Jackson Hooker (1785–1865)
 Hook.f. – Joseph Dalton Hooker (1817–1911)
 Hoopes – Josiah Hoopes (1832–1904)
 Hoot – Sara B. Hoot (fl. 1995)
 Hoppe – David Heinrich Hoppe (1760–1846)
 Hopper – Stephen Hopper (born 1951)
 Hoque  – Akramul Hoque (born 1971)
 Hora – Frederick Bayard Hora (1908–1984)
 Horan. –  (1796–1865)
 Horik. – Horikawa Yoshiwo (1902–1976)
 Horkel – Johann Horkel (1769–1846)
 Horne – John Horne (1835–1905)
 Hornem. – Jens Wilken Hornemann (1770–1841)
 Hornsch. – Christian Friedrich Hornschuch (1793–1850)
 Horobin – John F. Horobin (fl. 1990)
 Horridge – W. Horridge (fl. 1916)
 Horsf. – Thomas Horsfield (1773–1859)
 Horw. – Arthur Reginald Horwood (1879–1937)
 Hosaka – Edward Yataro Hosaka (1907–1961)
 H.Osborn – Henry Stafford Osborn (1823–1894)
 Hosok. – Takahide Hosokawa (born 1909)
 Hosseus – Carl Curt Hosseus (1878–1950)
 Host – Nicolaus Thomas Host (1761–1834)
 Hotchk. – Arland Tillotson Hotchkiss (born 1918)
 Hough – Romeyn Beck Hough (1857–1924)
 Houghton – Arthur Duvernoix Houghton (1870–1938)
 House – Homer Doliver House (1878–1949)
 Houst. – William Houstoun (1695–1733)
 Houtt. – Maarten Houttuyn (1720–1798)
 Houtz. – Gysbertus Houtzagers (1888–1957)
 Hovel. – Maurice Jean Alexandre Hovelacque (1858–1898)
 Hovenkamp – Peter Hans Hovenkamp (1953–2019)
 Howard – John Eliot Howard (1807–1883)
 Howcroft – N.H.S. Howcroft (fl. 1981)
 Howe – Elliot Calvin Howe (1828–1899)
 Howell – Thomas Jefferson Howell (1842–1912)
 H.O.Yates – Harris Oliver Yates (born 1934)
 Hoyos-Gómez – Saúl E. Hoyos-Gómez (fl. 2017)
 H.P.Banks – Harlan Parker Banks (1913–1998)
 H.Pearson – Henry Harold Welch Pearson (1870–1916)
 H.Peng – Hua Peng (born 1960)
 H.Perrier – Joseph Marie Henry Alfred Perrier de la Bâthie (1873–1958)
 H.Pfeiff. – Hans Heinrich Pfeiffer (1890–1970)
 H.P.Fuchs – Hans Peter Fuchs (1928–1999)
 H.Pottinger – Henry Pottinger (1789–1856)
 H.Prat – Henri Prat (1902–1981)
 H.P.Wood – Howard Page Wood (1924–2010)
 H.R.Fletcher – Harold Roy Fletcher (1907–1978)
 H.Rob. – Harold E. Robinson (1932–2020)
 H.Rock – Howard Francis Leonard Rock (1925–1964)
 H.Rosend. – Henrik Viktor Rosendahl (1855–1918)
 H.R.Sweet – Herman Royden Sweet (1909–1992)
 H.R.Wehrh. –  (1887–1940) (not to be confused with Wilhelm Wehrhahn (1857–1926), author abbreviation Wehrh.)
 H.Schaef. – Hanno Schaefer (born 1975), also "Hanno Schäfer"
 H.Schneid. – Harald Schneider (born 1962)
 H.Scholz – Hildemar Wolfgang Scholz (1928–2012)
 H.Schott – Heinrich Schott (1759–1819) (not to be confused with botanist Heinrich Wilhelm Schott (1794–1865))
 H.Sharsm. – Helen Katherine Sharsmith (1905–1982)
 H.Shaw – Henry Shaw (1800–1889)
 H.S.Holden – Henry Smith Holden (1887–1963)
 H.Sibth. – Humphry Waldo Sibthorp (1713–1797)
 H.S.Irwin – Howard Samuel Irwin (1928–2019)
 H.S.Kiu – Hua Shing Kiu (born 1929)
 H.S.Lo – Hsien Shui Lo (born 1927)
 H.Steedman – Henry Steedman (1866–1953)
 H.St.John – Harold St. John (1892–1991)
 H.Sun – Hang Sun (born 1963)
 H.T.Chang – Ho Tseng Chang (born 1898)
 H.Turner – Hubert Turner (born 1955)
 Hu – Hsen Hsu Hu (1894–1968)
 Hua – Henri Hua (1861–1919)
 Huamán – Alexander Huamán Mera (fl. 2009)
 Huber – Jacques Huber (1867–1914)
 Huds. – William Hudson (1730–1793)
 Hue – Auguste-Marie Hue (1840–1917)
 Hueber – Francis Maurice Hueber (born 1929)
 Huft – Michael J. Huft (born 1949)
 Hügel – Karl Alexander Anselm von Hügel (1794–1870)
 Hultén – Oskar Eric Gunnar Hultén (1894–1981)
 Humb. – Alexander von Humboldt (1769–1859)
 Humbert – Jean-Henri Humbert (1887–1967)
 Humblot – Léon Humblot (1852–1914)
 Hume – Allan Octavian Hume (1829–1912)
 Humphrey – James Ellis Humphrey (1861–1897)
 Humphries – Christopher John Humphries (1947–2009)
 Hung T.Chang – Hung Ta Chang (1914–2016)
 Hunt – George Edward Hunt (1841–1873)
 Hunter – Alexander Hunter (1729–1809)
 Hunz. – Armando Theodoro Hunziker (1919–2001)
 Hur.H.Sm.  – Huron Herbert Smith (1883–1933)
 Hürl. – Hans Hürlimann (1921–2014)
 Hurus. – Isao Hurusawa (born 1916)
 Hus – Henri Theodore Antoine de Leng Hus (born 1876)
 Husn. – Pierre Tranquille Husnot (1840–1929)
 Husseinov – Sch. A. Husseinov (born 1939)
 Hussenot – Louis Cincinnatus Sévérin Léon Hussenot (1809–1845)
 Husson – A. M. Husson (fl. 1952)
 Hust. – Friedrich Hustedt (1886–1968)
 Husz – Béla Husz (1892–1954)
 Hutch. – John Hutchinson (1884–1972)
 Huter – Rupert Huter (1834–1919)
 Huth – Ernst Huth (1845–1897)
 Hutton – William Hutton (1797–1860)
 Huxley – Anthony Julian Huxley (1920–1992)
 H.V.Hansen – Hans Vilhelm Hansen (born 1951)
 H.Vilm. – Charles Philippe Henry Lévêque de Vilmorin (1843–1899)
 H.W.Clark – Howard Walton Clark (1870–1941)
 H.Wendl. – Hermann Wendland (1825–1903)
 H.Whitehouse – Harold Leslie Keer Whitehouse (1917–2000)
 H.Whittier – Henry O. Whittier (born 1937)
 H.W.Kurz – Holger Willibald Kurz (born 1952)
 H.W.Li – Hsi Wen Li (born 1931)
 H.W.Sarg. – Henry Winthrop Sargent (1810–1882)
 H.Wulff – Heinz Diedrich Wulff (born 1910)
 Hyl. – Nils Hylander (1904–1970)
 Hynn. – T.M. Hynniewta (fl. 1978)
 H.Y.Su – Ho Yi Su (born 1937)

I–Z 

To find entries for I–Z, use the table of contents above.

 

1